The 1921 Caerphilly by-election was held on 24 August 1921.  The by-election was held due to the death of the incumbent Labour MP, Alfred Onions.  It was held for Labour by Morgan Jones.

Candidates and campaign
Morgan Jones clinched the Labour nomination despite not being the preferred candidate of the South Wales Miners' Federation. He was the first conscientious objector to be elected to Parliament after World War I.

The Communist Party of Great Britain (CPGB) stood Bob Stewart, a member of its executive committee.  The party had been founded in 1920, and this was its first Parliamentary election.  It sent almost all its leading figures to campaign in the election.

Result
Jones won an easy victory, with Edmunds in second, and the CPGB a distant third.

References

1921 in Wales
1920s elections in Wales
Caerphilly
1921 elections in the United Kingdom
By-elections to the Parliament of the United Kingdom in Welsh constituencies